Carapa is a genus of flowering plants in the mahogany family, Meliaceae. These are trees up to 30 meters tall occurring in tropical South America, Central America, and Africa. Common names include andiroba and crabwood.

Diversity
The list of species within this genus is still under discussion. Generally recognized species are:
Carapa guianensis (andiroba, crabwood): Amazon Region, Central America, Caribbean
Carapa megistocarpa (tangare): Ecuador
Carapa procera (African crabwood, kowi, okoto): West Africa, the Congos

Other proposed species:
Carapa akuri
Carapa alticola
Carapa longipetala
Carapa nicaraguensis
Carapa vasquezii

Uses
The timber is important, and oil is produced from the seeds. The name andiroba is from Nheengatu nhandi rob, meaning "bitter oil". Carapa guianensis produces oil similar to neem oil.

The oil contained in the almond andiroba is light yellow and extremely bitter. When subjected to a temperature below 25 °C, it solidifies producing a consistency like that of petroleum jelly. The oil contains olein, palmitine and glycerin.

Andiroba oil is one of the most commonly sold medicinal oils in the Amazon.  It is also used to repel mosquitoes by forming an oilseed cake into balls and burned, or mixed with annatto (Bixa orellana) and formed into a paste applied topically to protect the body from mosquito bites.

Andiroba oil is extracted from light brown seeds collected from beaches and rivers, where they float after being shed by the trees or from the forest ground.

References

External links
Carapa.org - information about genus Carapa

 
Meliaceae genera
Trees of Africa
Trees of Guyana
Plant toxin insecticides
Crops originating from South America
Taxa named by Jean Baptiste Christian Fusée-Aublet